Eric Ma Siu-cheung, GBS, JP (born 1963) is a Hong Kong engineer and government official. He served as Secretary for Development of the Hong Kong SAR government for less than four months in 2017.

Biography
Ma graduated from the University of Hong Kong with a Bachelor of Science in Engineering and later obtained a master's degree of Engineering Science in Transportation from Monash University, Australia. He became an engineer and held senior positions in major consulting firms and participated in major development projects in Hong Kong. He is a fellow of several professional bodies including the Hong Kong Institution of Engineers, the Chartered Institution of Highways and Transportation (CIHT), and the Institution of Structural Engineers. He also served as chairman of the Hong Kong branch of the CIHT.

Ma joined Maunsell Consultants Asia Ltd in 2001, becoming Managing Director in 2007. He was tasked by AECOM with its overseas business expansion in Asia, in which Ma became the Executive Vice President for Civil and Infrastructure Business in the Asia-Pacific Region.

On 6 January 2014, he was appointed Under Secretary of Development under Paul Chan Mo-po. He succeeded Chan to be Acting Secretary for Development on 16 January 2017 when Chan took over as Financial Secretary of Hong Kong. Ma was officially appointed on 13 February 2017.

On 26 April 2017, it was reported that Ma negligently left a tablet containing confidential government documents regarding future land use policies unattended in his vehicle which was later broken into.

References

1963 births
Living people
Government officials of Hong Kong
Hong Kong engineers
Alumni of the University of Hong Kong
Monash University alumni
Recipients of the Gold Bauhinia Star
Members of the Election Committee of Hong Kong, 2021–2026